Treorchy Rugby Football Club is a rugby union team from the village of Treorchy, in the Rhondda Valley, Wales. They formed in 1886 and by 1891 were a strong voice in the Welsh Football Union and were playing in the Rhondda Division.

Club history
With the industrialisation of the Rhondda, the game of rugby spread through the valley as the growing population looked for social activities to become involved in. Although not the first club to form in the Rhondda, Treorchy provided the first international player to represent Wales while still playing for a valley club. In the opening game of the 1886 Home Nations Championship, Treorchy provided the first 'Rhondda forward' when Sam Ramsey was selected to face England. Although Ramsey would only win two caps, and the second took a wait of eight years, Treorchy would provide several players throughout their history, including Billy Cleaver who would eventually play for the British Lions In 1907, Treorchy was accused of throwing a rugby game against Aberdare, which gave Aberdare the Glamorgan League title. The resulting enquiry by the WRU saw the permanent suspension of Treorchy's entire committee.

As Treorchy finished in the top four of the WRU premier division during the 1994/95 season they were given the privilege of hosting that year's touring international team Fiji.

Club honours
 1992/93 WRU Division Three - Champions
 1993/94 WRU Division Two - Champions
 2008/09 WRU Division Three South East - Champions
 2016/17 WRU Division One East Central - Champions

Notable former players 

See also :Category:Treorchy RFC players
The following players have played for Treorchy and have also been capped at international level.

Games played against international opposition

References

Rugby clubs established in 1886
Welsh rugby union teams
Sport in Rhondda Cynon Taf
1886 establishments in Wales